Lewis Alan Hoad (23 November 1934 – 3 July 1994) was an Australian tennis player whose career ran from 1950 to 1973. Hoad won four Major singles tournaments as an amateur (the Australian Championships, French Championships and two Wimbledons). He was a member of the Australian team that won the Davis Cup four times between 1952 and 1956. Hoad turned professional in July 1957. He won the Kooyong Tournament of Champions in 1958 and the Forest Hills Tournament of Champions in 1959. He won the Ampol Open Trophy world series of tournaments in 1959, which included the Kooyong tournament that concluded in early January 1960. Hoad's men's singles tournament victories spanned from 1951 to 1971.

Hoad was ranked the world No. 1 amateur in 1953 by Harry Hopman, by Noel Brown and by the editors of Tennis de France, and also in 1956 by Lance Tingay, by Ned Potter, and by Tennis de France. He was ranked the world No. 1 professional for 1959 in Kramer's Ampol point ranking system, and by Robert Barnes (Kramer's Australian manager).

Serious back problems plagued Hoad throughout his career, possibly caused by a weight-lifting exercise which he devised in 1954. The back injury became particularly intense following the 1956 Wimbledon championships, continued periodically, and led to his semi-retirement from tennis in 1967. Afterwards he made sporadic appearances at tournaments, enticed by the advent of the Open Era in 1968 and was seeded No. 7 for the 1968 Wimbledon Championships and seeded No. 12 for the 1970 French Open.

Following his retirement in 1973, Hoad and his wife Jenny Staley Hoad constructed, owned and operated a tennis resort, Lew Hoad's Campo de Tenis and Lew Hoad Tennis Village in Fuengirola, Spain, near Málaga. Hoad died of leukaemia on 3 July 1994.

Early life and career

Lewis Hoad was born on 23 November 1934, in the working-class Sydney inner suburb of Glebe, the eldest of three sons of tramway electrician Alan Hoad and his wife Ailsa Lyle Burbury. Hoad started playing tennis at age five with a racket gifted by a local social club. As a young child, he would wake up at 5 a.m. and hit tennis balls against a wall and garage door until the neighbours complained, and he was allowed to practice on the courts of the Hereford Tennis Club behind the house. At age 10 he competed in the seaside tournament at Manly in the under 16 category.

In his youth, Hoad often played Ken Rosewall, and they became known as the Sydney "twins", although they had very different physiques, personalities and playing styles. Their first match in Sydney in January 1947 (when both were aged 12) was played as an opener of an exhibition match between Australia and America. Rosewall won 6–0, 6–0. Hoad built up great physical strength, especially in his hands and arms, by training at a police boys' club, where he made a name as a boxer. Hoad was about 12 when he was introduced to Adrian Quist, a former Australian tennis champion and then general manager of the Dunlop sports goods company. Quist played a couple of sets with Hoad and was impressed by his natural ability. When Hoad was 14 he left school and joined the Dunlop payroll, following the pattern of that 'shamateur' era when most of Australia's brightest tennis prospects were employed by sporting goods companies.

Hoad had just turned 15 when he and Rosewall were selected to play for New South Wales in an interstate contest against Victoria. In November 1949, Hoad won the junior title at the New South Wales Championships, and the same weekend, he also competed in the final of the junior table tennis championship in Sydney.

Tennis career

Amateur career: 1950–1957

1950
Hoad lost to Dick Savitt in four sets in round one of the New South Wales State championships in November.  In his match report, Adrian Quist said, "Hoad played well, and held a lead of 4-2 in the third set after winning the second. At present he makes too many errors. He will have to learn good control from the ground before his game will reach great heights." Hoad reached the semi finals of County of Cumberland championships in Sydney in December, losing to Bill Sidwell. "It was apparent from the start of play that Sidwell did not intend to take the youngster lightly. He served with pressure and followed the majority of his returns to the net. The first set was very evenly contested. Had Hoad not fallen into easy errors he may well have won the opening set. The experience of Sidwell, however, prevailed during the important exchanges", said Adrian Quist.

1951
Hoad's first Grand Slam tournament appearance was at the 1951 Australian Championships held in January at the White City Tennis Club in Sydney. He won his first match against Ronald McKenzie in straight sets but lost in the following round to defending champion and countryman Frank Sedgman. It was the only Grand Slam tournament he played that year.
Hoad won his first men's singles title, the Brisbane Exhibition tournament at Milton, on grass, on 11 August 1951, defeating Rosewall in the final in four sets. In September, Hoad won New South Wales hardcourt championships beating George Worthington in the final.

1952
In 1952, Hoad reached the third round of the Australian Championships in Adelaide. In April, he was selected by the Australasian Lawn Tennis Association as member of the team to play in overseas tournaments. In May, before departing to Europe, he won the singles title at the Australian Hardcourt Championships on clay after a five-set win in the final against Rosewall. Hoad, who had never played a tournament on European red clay courts, received a walkover in the first round of the French Championships and lost in straight sets to sixth-seeded and 1947 and 1951 finalist Eric Sturgess. In only their second appearance as a doubles team at a Grand Slam event, Hoad and Rosewall reached the French semifinal. Hoad lost in the quarterfinal of the Belgian championships in Brussels in early June, where he was defeated by Budge Patty.
Hoad's first entry at the grass court Queen's Club Championship in June 1952 ended in the quarterfinal against eventual champion Frank Sedgman. A week later, he played his first match at the Wimbledon Championships defeating Beppe Merlo in a nervous and unimpressive five-set encounter. Wins against Rolando Del Bello and Freddie Huber were followed by a fourth round loss against second-seeded and eventual finalist Jaroslav Drobný. Hoad and Rosewall caused an upset when they defeated second-seeded Gardnar Mulloy and Dick Savitt in the third round of the doubles event, but lost in the semifinal against Vic Seixas and Eric Sturgess.

After a semifinal result at the Swedish championships in July, and an exhibition between Australia and West Germany, Hoad and the Australian team traveled to the United States under the guidance of coach Harry Hopman. As a preparation for his first U.S. Championships he played the Meadow Club Invitational (Southampton), Eastern Grass Court Championships (South Orange), and Newport Invitational before teaming up with Rosewall to reach the semifinal of the U.S. National Doubles Championships in Brookline. Hoad was the eighth seeded foreign player at the U.S. Championships. He won four matches to reach his first Grand Slam quarterfinal but due in part to making 64 errors could not overcome Sedgman who would win the tournament without losing a set. With Thelma Coyne Long he reached the final of the mixed doubles event, the first Grand Slam final of his career, but they lost in straight sets to Doris Hart and Frank Sedgman. An early loss at the Pacific Southwest Championships in September concluded his first overseas tour. In September, he was jointly ranked No. 10 in the world for 1952 with Rosewall by Lance Tingay of The Daily Telegraph.

1953

Hoad started 1953 poorly in the singles with a second-round exit against Clive Wilderspin at the Australian Championships in Melbourne after playing an uncharacteristic baseline game. He was more successful in doubles where he and Rosewall became the youngest team to win the Australian doubles title after a victory in the final against Mervyn Rose and Don Candy. In March, Hoad defended his singles title at the Australian Hardcourt Championships, defeating Rosewall in a five set semifinal in which he survived six matchpoints, and 34-year-old John Bromwich in the final. Two weeks later, Hoad lost the final of the N.S.W. Hardcourt Championships against Mervyn Rose. Hoad's second overseas tour started in late April, and after an exhibition in Cairo at the Gezira Sporting Club, he reached the final at Italian Championships in Rome losing to Drobný in straight sets but won the doubles title with Rosewall. At the French Championships in May, Hoad was seeded fourth and made it to the quarterfinals in which he lost to Vic Seixas due to overhitting and an unreliable serve. Hoad and Rosewall won the doubles title with a three-set win in the final against countrymen Rose and Wilderspin. In June Hoad's attacking serve-and-volley game proved too good for Wimbledon favorite Rosewall in the final of the Queen's Club Championship and he won the tournament without losing a set. At Wimbledon, Hoad was seeded sixth, and as at the French, Vic Seixas defeated him in the quarterfinal, this time in a close five-set match that ended on a Hoad double fault. In an all-Australian doubles final Hoad and Rosewall defeated Hartwig and Rose. Hoad lost to Enrique Morea in the final of the Dutch Championships in mid July. He won his first title on U.S. soil in South Orange at the Eastern Grass Court Championships in mid August, defeating compatriot Rex Hartwig in the final. In the semifinal against Rosewall, he pulled a back muscle. Hoad and Rosewall's hopes of winning the doubles Grand Slam, two years after fellow Australians Ken McGregor and Frank Sedgman had first achieved that feat, were dashed when they lost surprisingly in the third round of the U.S. Doubles Championships. At the U.S. Championships Hoad (second foreign seed) won four matches to reach the semifinal where for the third time in 1953 he lost in a Grand Slam event to Vic Seixas. Following his defeat, and that of Rosewall in the other semifinal, there was criticism in the press that both 18-year-old players were physically and mentally worn out due to the intensive schedule imposed by coach Harry Hopman. In September, Seixas again beat Hoad, this time in the semifinal of the Pacific Southwest Championships in Los Angeles.

Hoad was rested a few weeks upon his return to Australia and then won the Queensland Championships in early November in a 41-minute final against Hartwig. Two weeks later, Hoad won the N.S.W. Championships after four-set victories over Tony Trabert in the semi-final and over Rosewall in the final in front of a 10,000 Sydney crowd but had trouble with a sore right elbow. In early December at the Victorian Championships he defeated Rosewall in the final. The much anticipated Davis Cup challenge round match against the challenging team from the United States took place at the Melbourne Kooyong Stadium in late December. Surprisingly Hartwig was selected to partner Hoad in the doubles instead of Rosewall, a decision widely criticized in the press. In the opening singles matches, Hoad defeated Seixas, his nemesis that season, in straight sets, while Trabert defeated Rosewall, also in straight sets. Hoad and Hartwig lost the doubles match against Seixas and Trabert and Australia trailed 1–2 at the start of the final day. Hoad is remembered for his match as a 19-year-old amateur against the United States champion Tony Trabert. In front of a 17,000 crowd, Hoad defeated Trabert in five sets to help his country retain the Cup. It was seen as one of the best Davis Cup matches in history. Directly following the final, Hoad received his call-up papers for National Service.

Hoad was ranked world No. 5 amateur for 1953 by Lance Tingay in his September rankings. At the end of the year, Hoad was ranked world No. 1 amateur for the complete season of 1953 by Harry Hopman, by Noel Brown and by the editors of Tennis de France, published by Philippe Chatrier. Tingay stated in September 1954 that Hoad in 1953 had  "played so well during the Australian season that his status as best in the world was axiomatic." He added that for the 1954 season, "His form since has been almost disastrous. Hoad's decline has been a mystery." Hoad was the youngest tennis player ever at 19 years 38 days to achieve world No. 1 rankings, a record which still stands.

1954

In January, Hoad played just one tournament before entering his National Service training. At the South Australian Championships in Adelaide he reached the final but sub-par play led to a straight-sets defeat to Trabert. On 13 January, Hoad joined the 13th National Service Training battalion in Ingleburn for a period of 98 days and commented that "It will be a welcome break from tennis". As a consequence, Hoad was unable to participate in the Australian Championships. At the end of February, Hoad received a leave from service to play for the Australian team at Kooyong stadium in the third Test match against South Africa in front of the Queen and the Duke of Edinburgh. He won a singles match against Abe Segal, won a doubles match with Rosewall and lost a mixed-doubles match with his girlfriend Jenny Staley. When Hoad returned to service, he was bitten by a spider while on maneuvers which caused him to become ill and hospitalized him for ten days. He spent two days in coma which was not made public.

While he was in service, Hoad devised a weight-lifting exercise, doing push-ups with round 50 lb. weights placed on his back, which Hoad later believed probably initiated his back trouble. Hoad left the National Service at the end of April and his third overseas tour with an Australian team started on 5 May. For the first time in his career, Hoad was the top-seeded player at a Grand Slam tournament at the French Championships but he lost in the fourth round to 40-year-old Gardnar Mulloy. Hoad lost the doubles final with Rosewall to Seixas and Trabert in 56 minutes. Partnering Maureen Connolly, who had won the women's singles title, Hoad won the mixed-doubles final against Jacqueline Patorni and Rex Hartwig. In June, Hoad overcame countryman Rose in the final of the Queen's Club Championship to successfully defend his title. Hoad was seeded second behind Trabert at Wimbledon Championships. In the fourth round, Hoad avenged his loss to Mulloy at the French Championships, defeating him in four sets. In the quarterfinal the powerful service and excellent returns of Drobný proved too much for Hoad and he was beaten in straight sets within an hour. Hoad and Rosewall were unable to defend their Wimbledon doubles title after losing in fives sets in the semifinal to Seixas and Trabert. A surprise loss against Roger Becker in the semifinal at the Midlands Counties Championships in Birmingham was followed in mid-July by winning the singles title at the Swiss Championships in Gstaad. As in the previous year, Hoad met Rosewall in the Eastern Grass Court Championships in August, this time in the final, and again the titleholder was victorious, overpowering Rosewall to win the singles title in three straight sets. At Newport in mid August, Hoad was beaten by 17-year-old compatriot Roy Emerson who won the deciding set 8–6. For the third time in 1954, Seixas and Trabert defeated Hoad and Rosewall at a Grand Slam doubles event, winning the U.S. Doubles Championships in Brookline.
 
Hoad, no. 1 foreign seed at the U.S. Championships, lost to Ham Richardson in a five-set quarterfinal. His lackluster form continued when he was defeated by unseeded Luis Ayala in the quarterfinal of the Pacific Southwest Championships in mid-September. After returning to Australia at the end of September, Hoad scheduled extra practice to work on his serve and volley but subsequently lost to Don Candy in the semifinal of the Sydney Metropolitan Championships. In early November, matters briefly improved. In the final of the Queensland Championships in Brisbane, he overcame a sunstroke and the loss of sets three and four by 0–6 to defeat Hartwig in five sets. In mid-November, he was upset by veteran John Bromwich who better exploited the windy conditions in the quarterfinal of the N.S.W. Championships. At the Victorian Championships, the last significant tournament before the Davis Cup Challenge Round, Hoad was defeated in straight sets in the semifinal by Seixas. As in the previous match against Sven Davidson he showed such poor form and at times an apparent lack of interest that he was jeered by the crowd and several left after he smashed a ball into the stands. The 1954 Davis Cup Challenge Round was played on 27–29 December on the grass courts at the White City Stadium in Sydney between title holders Australia and the United States. Hoad lost the first rubber to Trabert, in front of a record crowd of 25,000, in a high-quality four-set match. Rosewall also lost his singles match and the United States won back the cup after Seixas and Trabert defeated Hoad and Rosewall in four sets in the doubles rubber.

In a season review article in the Dunlop Lawn Tennis Annual & Almanack editor and former tennis player G.P. Hughes mentioned that "Hoad in particular had a bad year". In a 1956 interview, Hoad admitted that especially in 1954 he often got fed-up with tennis and didn't care whether he played or not. In September, Hoad's world ranking had slipped to No. 7 in Tingay's ranking. Tingay, Chatrier and other writers ranked Hoad world No. 5 in a collaborative ranking. However, Hoad was ranked world No. 4 in Ned Potter's rankings for 1954 in World Tennis, which was a higher ranking than Potter had given Hoad in 1953 at No. 5.

1955
Hoad was unable to play the South Australian tennis championship in early January due to a torn ligament. To some surprise he entered the mixed doubles event at the 1955 Australian Championships with his girlfriend Jenny Staley and the pair finished as runner-ups to Thelma Coyne Long and George Worthington. In the singles event, Hoad reached his first Grand Slam tournament final after solid wins over Seixas (quarterfinal) and Hartwig (semifinal). In the final Rosewall's accuracy and control were too strong for him and he lost in three straight sets. Hoad did not participate in the French Championships as the Davis Cup team that he was part of only left for Europe at the end of May during the Championships. In the singles final of the Queen's Club Championship in mid-June Hoad, who was married earlier that day, lost his service seven times and lost to Rosewall in two straight sets but won the doubles event with Hartwig. Hoad was the fourth-seeded player at the Wimbledon Championships at the end of June. In his quarterfinal match against seventh-seeded Budge Patty, his game lacked accuracy and he conceded a break in each set resulting in a loss in straight sets.

Having lost the Davis Cup in 1954, Australia had to play through the 1955 Davis Cup preliminary rounds to challenge holders United States. In July, Australia defeated Mexico, Brazil and Canada to win the Americas Zone and subsequently beat Japan and Italy in the Inter-zone matches in August. In the Challenge Round at the West Side Tennis Club, Forest Hills from 26 to 28 August, Hoad defeated the French and Wimbledon champion Trabert in four sets in his first singles rubber and with Hartwig won the doubles match to reclaim the Davis Cup for Australia. These were the first ever tennis matches televised in color, on the first national color broadcast by NBC television.

Hoad was no. 2 foreign seed at the U.S. Championships held from 2 to 11 September, immediately after the Davis Cup Challenge Round, on the muddy courts of Forest Hills. In the quarterfinal, he lost his service three times in succession in the third set and suffered a straight-sets defeat in 50 minutes against Trabert, the first-seeded U.S. player, and eventual champion.  In his first significant tournament after the U.S. Championships, Hoad won the New South Wales Championships in November after a win in the final against Rosewall. In December, he won the singles title at the Victorian Championships after a tough five-sets final win over 19-year old Ashley Cooper. In September, he was ranked No. 3 in the world according to Tingay, and was ranked world No. 3 for 1955 by Ned Potter in World Tennis.

1956

Hoad started the year with a five-set defeat in the final of the South Australian Championships against countryman Neale Fraser. At the following Manly tournament, the crowd overflowed the stands during the final hindering Rosewall's "baseline defensive game" more than Hoad's attacking style, resulting in a straight-sets win for Hoad in 35 minutes. At the Australian Championships in Brisbane, Hoad overcame a two sets to one deficit against Mervyn Rose in the quarterfinal and beat Neale Fraser in the semifinal to reach his second consecutive Australian final, where he overcame titleholder Rosewall in four sets to win his first Grand Slam singles title. He won the doubles title with Rosewall against Don Candy and Mervyn Rose. At the beginning of March, Hoad and his wife left for an overseas private tour (a tour sanctioned but not organised by the Australian tennis federation). First stop of the tour was Cairo where Hoad won the singles title at the Egyptian Championships against Sven Davidson followed by a tournament win in Alexandria over Fred Kovaleski. At Monte Carlo in late March, he was surprisingly beaten by Tony Vincent in the quarterfinal. In the Australian ranking published in April, reflecting the season until the end of March, Hoad overtook Rosewall as No. 1. Singles titles at the Lebanese Championships and at the Connaught Club in Essex followed in April but the month ended with a semifinal loss to Ham Richardson at the British Hard Court Championships in Bournemouth.

Hoad won his first Italian Championships on red clay at the Foro Italico in Rome in early May when he outplayed Sven Davidson in straight sets. At the French Championships at Roland Garros, Hoad survived a five-set scare against Robert Abdesselam in the third round before winning the final against Sven Davidson in straight sets to claim his second consecutive Grand Slam singles title. Unknown to the public, Hoad had stayed up the night previous to the final, invited by a Russian diplomat, and was drunk when he came home. An intensive workout by Rod Laver got him into a state that allowed him to play the final. Following the win in Paris, Hoad stated his intention to remain amateur after 1956, "Even if I win the three big tournaments, even if Kramer raised his offer, I still wouldn't turn pro for at least two or three seasons." In May, Hoad won the International Golden Ball tournament in Wiesbaden, West Germany after a straight-sets victory in the final over Art Larsen but at the Trofeo Conde de Godó in Barcelona, he lost in the quarterfinal to Bob Howe. As a preparation for Wimbledon, Hoad played the singles event at the Northern Championships in Manchester but lost to 34-year old Jaroslav Drobný in the final 7–5 in the deciding set. Hoad was seeded first for the Wimbledon Championships. He lost two sets en route to the final, one to Mal Anderson in the quarterfinal and one to Ham Richardson in the semifinal. In the final he faced Rosewall. In the first all-Australian final since 1922, Hoad was victorious in four sets to gain his first Wimbledon and third successive Grand Slam championship title. Hoad also won the doubles title with Rosewall, their third Wimbledon title, defeating Orlando Sirola and Nicola Pietrangeli in the final in straight sets. Following his Wimbledon title he lost in the semi final of the Midlands tournament to Mike Davies. In August, Hoad won the singles title at the German Championships, on clay at Hamburg, with a four-set defeat of Orlando Sirola in the final.

Immediately after Wimbledon, Hoad experienced severe pain and stiffness in his lower back, at a level higher than before the tournament. He arranged to travel to the U.S. by boat on the  rather than suffer a long plane trip. However, the pain continued and reduced the level of his play for the remainder of the year and into 1957.

After arrival in New York on 21 August, Hoad travelled to Brookline to partner Rosewall in the U.S. Doubles Championships which they won to complete their career doubles Grand Slam. From there he went to the Forest Hills stadium in New York to play his first match in the singles U.S. Championships. He had missed the preparatory grass court tournament at Newport. Having won the first three stages of the Grand Slam, Hoad was favoured to win the fourth and then turn professional for a lucrative contract offered by Jack Kramer, although Hoad himself claimed that he never thought about the Grand Slam and did not hear of it before he arrived in New York. Hoad lost the U.S. Championships final at Forest Hills in four sets to Rosewall. Hoad and Rosewall won the doubles title against Seixas and Richardson. In September Hoad defeated Luis Ayala in the semifinal and Sven Davidson in a four set final at the O'Keefe Invitational at the Toronto Lawn Tennis Club in Rosedale, Toronto on red clay  and at the Pacific Southwest Championships, the last leg of his overseas tour, Hoad was beaten by Alex Olmedo in the third round. In November he lost the final of the Queensland Championships to Ashley Cooper in five sets and was hindered by numbness in the serving arm between the elbow and the wrist. In mid December Hoad and Rosewall competed in the final of the Victorian Championships which was their last final as amateurs as Rosewall turned professional at the end of the month. The final started late due to rain and was stopped due to darkness at two sets to one for Hoad but the following day Rosewall won the last two sets and the title. In late December, Hoad was part of the Australian Davis Cup team which defended the Cup in the Challenge Round against the United States. Hoad was confined to bed with back pain for the two days prior to the Davis Cup matches, and was relieved to find that he could play well. In his last Davis Cup appearance, Hoad won both his singles rubbers, against Herbie Flam and Seixas, as well as his doubles match with Rosewall to help Australia to a 5–0 victory.

Hoad was ranked world No. 1 amateur by Lance Tingay in September, by Ned Potter in October in World Tennis and at the end of the year by Tennis de France. Hoad won 16 tournaments in 1956, and 17 doubles titles.

1957
Hoad played poorly in early 1957, due to back trouble, and was placed in an upper body cast for six weeks, following which he slowly returned to tennis competition in April 1957. He then experienced a period of pain-free playing for 11 months. He won the Northern Championships in Manchester, beating Ramanathan Krishnan in the final. Hoad won his second successive Wimbledon singles title, defeating Ashley Cooper in a straight-sets final that lasted 57 minutes.

Professional career: 1957–1973

1957
After winning the 1957 Wimbledon title, Hoad turned professional by signing a two-year contract with Kramer for a record guarantee of US$125,000, or AUS£55,500, which included a US$25,000 bonus for winning the 1957 Wimbledon singles title. This was the highest guarantee that would be given to an amateur turning pro, with Laver receiving the second highest. Hoad's business relationship with Kramer in 1957 and later was congenial and smooth compared to the experiences of Pancho Gonzales. Hoad would later claim, "I never had a problem with Jack Kramer."

On 14 July 1957, Hoad won his debut match as a professional against Frank Sedgman at the Forest Hills Tournament of Champions, broadcast live nationally on the CBS television network. He won his next match, against Pancho Segura, but lost the last three to finish joint third in the round robin event behind Gonzales and Sedgman. After Forest Hills, Hoad commented on the difference between amateur and professional tennis: "It's an entirely different league. These pros make mistakes but they don't make them on vital points. That's the difference.". At the following Masters round robin tournament played on cement courts at the Los Angeles Tennis Club he lost all six of his matches to finish in last place, commenting "I don't like cement courts...". After these defeats Kramer commented that Hoad would have to change his playing style: "His second serve is too shallow. His opponents massacre it. He must shorten his backhand or play deeper in his returning service." Kramer stated that there was a psychological factor connected with Hoad's defeats “as he never has done well on these courts in Los Angeles and thinks they are his jinx. But, wait until he gets going in the indoor circuit, and then you’ll see an entirely different player, both mentally and physically.”​

In September Hoad embarked on a four-month 4-man tour of Europe, Africa, the Middle East, Asia, and Australia together with Kramer (Sedgman replaced Kramer in Australia), Rosewall, and Segura. Kramer and Hoad were interviewed live on BBC television. Kramer gave his estimation of Hoad's game: "I feel that he's potentially the best player that tennis might ever have." Kramer cited Hoad's recent marathon win over Rosewall at The Hague on red clay as evidence of improvement in his play. At the Wembley Indoor Pro Championships in late September, Kramer eliminated Hoad, defeating him in straight sets, and Kramer also defeated Gonzales for third place. The two players would be Kramer's headliners in the upcoming world pro tennis championship tour. In the 4-man tour of 1957, Hoad finished with slight edges over the other players, 16–15 over Rosewall, 16–14 over Kramer, 13–9 over Segura, 4–2 over Sedgman. Hoad was ranked combined world No. 3 behind Gonzales and Sedgman and ahead of Rosewall and Segura for 1957 by Quist.

1958
In 1958 a projected series of 100 head-to-head matches was commenced between Hoad and the reigning champion of professional tennis, Pancho Gonzales, together with an undercard series between Trabert and Segura. The series started in January in a number of Australian cities in stadiums on grass courts with mostly a best-of-five set format, and in New Zealand for three matches with a best-of-three set format, and at the end of the Australasian subtour, Hoad was leading 8 to 5. Most venues reported record crowds, including the first Kooyong encounter, which Hoad won in a 3 and 3/4 hour, four-sets, 80-games marathon in front of 12,000 spectators. From 5 to 4 down in New Zealand, Hoad launched a 15 to 3 winning streak against Gonzales (including the non-tour Kooyong Tournament of Champions deciding match and the third-place match at Sydney Masters). In February, the series continued in the United States, mostly in indoor venues and local gyms with a best-of-three set format, played on a portable canvas surface.  Hoad would experience a thigh injury in May and June. But Hoad won 18 of the first 27 matches, and in late February Gonzales had, according to Kramer, the look of a "beaten man". However, after they played an outdoor match on 1 March on a chilly night in Palm Springs, Hoad's back stiffened which affected him significantly for the rest of the series. Twice Hoad was forced to take time off to rest his back and was substituted for in his absence by Rosewall and Trabert. From 9–18 Gonzales surged to a 26–23 lead, and at the end of the series on 8 June, he had defeated Hoad by 51 matches to 36.

In late 1958, Jack Kramer was asked which of the many "World Professional Championships" tournaments he considered deserving of the title, and he named four tournaments under his own aegis: Forest Hills, L.A. Masters, Kooyong and Sydney White City. Hoad won three of these eight tournaments in 1958/59. For the 1958/1959 seasons, Kramer had a troupe of professional champions that included 11 Hall of Fame players, under contract, and he designed a series of tournaments to provide a format in which all of them could participate. In January 1958, Hoad won the Kooyong Tournament of Champions in Melbourne, the richest tournament of  the year. The tournament was funded by the Australian oil company Ampol. Hoad defeated Gonzales and Sedgman in deciding matches, and won all five of his matches in the round-robin event. During the world championship tour in the U.S. in May, the four players participated in the Cleveland event. In the final at Cleveland on 5 May, Hoad lost a two-set lead against Gonzales while struggling with his leg-muscle injury. Hoad dropped out of the tour in late May to rest his thigh injury. At the Forest Hills Tournament of Champions in June 1958, Hoad's thigh injury healed in time for his final match which he won against Gonzales on the final day.  However, Gonzales won the event with a better overall round-robin record. At Roland Garros in September, Hoad won his quarterfinal against Trabert, and his semifinal against Gonzales. While leading in the final against Rosewall, Hoad wrenched his back reaching for a ball, and could not play well in the remainder of the match. He had to default the Wembley Pro tournament in September due to an "arthritic" back. Hoad rested for the next three months and did not play again until 1959. Jack March ranked Hoad world No. 2 professional tennis player behind Gonzales for 1958. Jack Kramer ranked Hoad  No. 4 for 1958, with Gonzales first, Sedgman second, Rosewall third.

1959
In early 1959, it was announced that the Australian oil company Ampol, would provide an award of AUS£2,500 (US$5,600), plus the Ampol Open Trophy, to the "acknowledged world's best tennis player", adjudged from a world series of tournaments managed by Jack Kramer. All of the best pros would be ranked by a point system which would determine the seeding list for all tournaments. The first five tournaments of the series were played in Australia on a portable outdoor wooden plywood court, playing slow on a sand/paint surface for traction, but with no sliding possible. Hoad began the series slowly, hampered by an elbow injury. At the end of January, Hoad defeated Rosewall and Cooper to win at Perth and in February 1959, he defeated Rosewall in three sets to win the South Australian Pro tournament at the Norwood Cricket Oval in Adelaide. This gave Hoad the lead in Ampol bonus points after the first group of five tournaments, a lead which he would not relinquish until the Ampol Open Trophy series ended in January 1960.

In the four-man 1959 Kramer World Professional Championship Tour, which ran from 20 February – 31 May in North America, Hoad built a lead of 12 to 5 in his series of matches against Gonzales, after a win in Newcastle, Pennsylvania in late April. Gonzales stated that "I had blisters under my blisters from the punishment" on that tour. However, the daily grind of the tour began to cause a renewal of Hoad's back trouble, and he finally won against Gonzales by 15 matches to 13. He also won his head-to-head's with newly turned pro Ashley Cooper (18–2) and Mal Anderson (9–5). With a win–loss record of 42–20 he finished second in the four-man tour behind Gonzales (47–15).  The championship was based on money won. This would be the only 4-man world professional championship tour in which the winner would have a losing record against one of the other players, and the second-place finisher would have winning records against all of the other players. Four-man world championship tours were held in 1942, 1954, 1959, and 1960. In late April the players in the 4-man tour played in the Cleveland event, and Hoad lost the final to Gonzales in three straight sets.

The L.A. Masters round robin from 5–14 June, was held at the L.A. Tennis Club on concrete, and was part of the Ampol series. Hoad and Gonzales both finished with five wins and one loss, but Gonzales won the title on account of his victory over Hoad in their head-to-head match, which had been the first match for both in the event. During the tournament, Hoad received several Hollywood offers for screen tests, but turned them down with the comment "What do I want with money?". At the O'Keefe Professional Championships on red clay at Toronto Lawn Tennis Club from 16 to 21 June, also part of the Ampol series, Hoad lost to Sedgman and Rosewall lost to Trabert. Gonzales won the tournament by beating Cooper, Trabert and Sedgman.

The Forest Hills Tournament of Champions from 23 to 28 June, played on grass at the Forest Hills stadium in New York, and part of the Ampol series, awarded the largest winners' cheques of the season. Hoad defeated Mal Anderson in the quarterfinal, Rosewall in the semifinal in four sets and Gonzales in the final, also in four sets, to claim the title. Gonzales appeared tired near the end of the match, but had declared in an interview prior to the final, "I feel fit, very fit. Until Hoad beats me, I'm not worried." In the August 1959 issue of World Tennis, Riggs wrote of the Forest Hills final, "the match signified the end of an era. The great Gonzales who had dominated professional tennis for four years had been decisively beaten..."

In August 1959, Hoad defeated Cawthorn and Worthington to reach the final of  the Slazenger Pro Championships in Eastbourne, but lost to Cooper in the final. In September, Hoad lost to Sedgman in the semifinal of the French Pro at Roland Garros, part of the Ampol series, but defeated Rosewall in a playoff for third place. At the Wembley Indoor Championships, part of the Ampol series, Hoad was upset by Segura in the second round, and Segura eventually lost the final to Anderson in a close match. In the Grand Prix de Europe tour from August to October, which excluded Roland Garros and Wembley, Hoad finished in third place behind Sedgman and Rosewall (Gonzales defaulted the European tour).

Hoad won the Perth and Adelaide Memorial Drive events in November and December to begin the final group of Ampol tournaments, which were played on grass courts in tennis stadiums. At the Sydney White City Tournament of Champions from 8–13 December, Hoad injured his hip in the semifinal against Anderson, and lost the final to Gonzales in straight sets.  At Brisbane Milton Courts from 15 to 19 December, Rosewall defeated Hoad in the semifinal and Gonzales in the final in long matches. The final event of the Ampol Open Trophy series, the Qantas International Kooyong Championships at Melbourne, began on 26 December 1959. With a victory at Kooyong, either Hoad or Gonzales would have won the series. Gonzales decided to return to the U.S. for the holidays to be with his fiancée, although Kramer had warned that "it could cost Gonzales AUS£5,000 by going home for Christmas." Gonzales thereby defaulted the Ampol series to Hoad.  On 24 December, the day following Gonzales' departure, Hoad announced that he would not participate in the upcoming 4-man tour in January 1960. On 2 January 1960, Hoad defeated Rosewall in a three-and-a-half hour, four-set match to win the Kooyong tournament, a match which Kramer acclaimed as one of the best ever played. With Hoad's successful defence of the Kooyong title also came the Ampol Open Trophy win and bonus money award.

The Ampol Open Trophy "world series" or "world's open tennis championship" (it was named "open" in case open tennis arrived, which it did not for some years) had consisted of 15 tournaments around the world between 10 January 1959 and 2 January 1960. Hoad finished first in the series with 51 bonus points, ahead of Gonzales (43 points) and Rosewall (41 points).  The Melbourne Age stated, Hoad "was crowned the new world professional tournament champion at Kooyong" by winning the Ampol world series. The Sydney Morning Herald reported that Hoad had won "the title of world's top professional tennis player" and was "the game's top money-earner" for 1959. French language L'Impartial on 6 January 1960 stated "Lewis Hoad world champion", the win at Kooyong "allows him at the same time to claim the world title for 1959". In an advertisement in World Tennis magazine in June 1960, Hoad was described as "world champion Lew Hoad". Kramer's brochure described the Ampol series with the term "World Championship Tennis".  There had also been references of Gonzales between January and April 1960 being described variously that he was "world professional tennis champion, will defend his title", was advertised as "WORLD PRO CHAMPION", was "world professional champion", "goes after an unprecedented sixth straight world crown", was "perennial professional champion", was described in UPI newswire reports  as "world professional tennis champion since 1954", "titleholder" of the "world professional tennis championship"  and that Gonzales with "five world series championships as his record, defeated Ken Rosewall at Cairns last night in straight sets and added further to his claims for his sixth successive world title". On 15 January 1960, Lawn Tennis and Badminton said Hoad was taking a six-month rest and the article stated "J. Kramer is urging Hoad not to take this step, as during this year he will have his best chance of taking R. A. Gonzales' world professional title from him".

Kramer's office reported that in 1959 Hoad had won his personal series of matches against Gonzales 24 to 23.

Kramer placed Hoad in fourth place in his personal world professional rating for 1959, the same ranking which Kramer awarded to Hoad in 1958 and 1960. Jack March ranked Hoad second behind Gonzales for 1959, the same ranking which he had given Hoad for 1958. Robert Roy in the French sportspaper L'Équipe ranked Hoad fifth as of mid-December, behind Gonzales, Sedgman, Rosewall, and Trabert. Kramer's Australian tennis agent Bob Barnes placed Hoad in first spot, corresponding to Hoad's standing on the official Ampol ranking, with Gonzales second, Rosewall third, Sedgman fourth, and Trabert fifth.
 Mal Anderson, in a conversation in World Tennis, recalled that "Kramer established a point system to decide the best players...Lew finished ahead of Pancho" followed by Rosewall, Sedgman, and Trabert.

1960
Hoad decided not to play in the 4-man 1960 world championship tour and took a three-month layoff at the beginning of 1960 to rest his back and spend time with his family. When he returned to play, he was rusty, slow, and carried some extra weight, but he gradually recovered his form. He won a New Zealand tour in April, over Anderson, Sedgman, and Cooper. In May, Hoad commenced his participation in Kramer's tournament series for 1960, which used a point system to rank the players. Gonzales withdrew from the tournament series just before it began. Hoad lost a five-set final to Rosewall at the Melbourne Olympic Pool where a court was set up on the drained pool floor. Hoad, Rosewall, and most of the pros did not play in the Cleveland World Pro which, as in 1959, was not a part of Kramer's tournament series. However, Hoad and Trabert played a match in Cincinnati, Trabert's home town, won by Hoad, just before the Cleveland event, where Trabert would be runner-up to Olmedo. Hoad won tournament finals in June at Santa Barbara, California and in September at Geneva, Switzerland, both over Rosewall, but appeared out of condition in the Roland Garros final against Rosewall. At the Wembley Indoor Championships that year, Hoad was again upset by Segura in the second round. In late 1960, Hoad won the inaugural Japanese Professional Championships in Tokyo, beating Rosewall, Cooper, and Gimeno. The event drew 7,000 fans for each of the four evenings of play, with the Crown Prince and Princess in attendance the first evening. In the final, Hoad prevailed at 13–11 in the fifth set over Rosewall, saving three match points. Following the marathon Tokyo final, Hoad withdrew from the remaining tournaments in the point series with back trouble, and the final projected tournament in Australia was not played. The final results of Kramer's tournament series for 1960 are unknown. Hoad and Gonzales did not play against each other in 1960. Hoad was ranked world No. 2 professional tennis player behind Gonzales in a newspaper report.

1961

Hoad played a few one-set matches on the 1961 Professional World Series tour in January, but soon withdrew because of a broken left foot and was substituted for by first Trabert and then Sedgman. He finished fourth in a tour of five Soviet cities in July, behind Trabert, Buchholz, and Segura, returning to play after his broken foot had healed.  In late August and September, Hoad and Gonzales played a ten-match best-of-three sets tour of Britain and Ireland, with Buchholz and Davies playing the undercard matches. Hoad won his series against Gonzales by a score of six matches to four. Hoad won four of the five matches in the series which were played on grass. In September, Hoad lost in the first round of the French Pro to Luis Ayala. At the Wembley Pro, Hoad defeated Gonzales in a four-set semifinal. In the final against Rosewall, in the second game of the match, Hoad pulled his back while running for a backhand volley and suffered a recurrence of his old back injury, and could no longer run, losing in four sets. In November, Hoad won the fifth and deciding rubber for Australia against the United States in the final of the inaugural Kramer Cup (the pro equivalent of the Davis Cup) by beating Trabert in four sets. Trabert said afterwards: "Trying to stop Lew in that final set was like fighting a machine gun with a rubber knife". Robert Roy in L'Équipe ranked Hoad as the third-best player of the year. In July 1961 Gardnar Mulloy rated Hoad as world No. 1 ahead of Gonzales, and the favourite to win a prospective open Wimbledon.

1962
There was no official pro championship tour in 1962, as Laver and Emerson had declined to accept pro offers made by Kramer at the 1961 Wimbledon. Kramer resigned as tour promoter and director. From 14 to 17 March 1962, Hoad won the Adelaide Professional Championships, beating Rosewall, Gimeno, and Sedgman, the final against Rosewall very close. In late August, Hoad played a five-match, best-of-three sets tour in Britain against Trabert, defeating Trabert at Nottingham, Edinburgh, Bournemouth, and Dublin, while Trabert won at Scarborough. Hoad won the professional tournament in Zürich in September 1962 by a win in the final against Pancho Segura. In late September, Hoad lost to Rosewall in a -hour, four-set final at Wembley. Hoad and Rosewall teamed to win the doubles final at both Roland Garros and Wembley. In October, Hoad was awarded the Facis Trophy for winning the pro tour of Italy. In the 1962 Kramer Cup tournament, in best-of-five set formats, Hoad defeated Gimeno in the semifinal tie in Turin, Italy on clay, and Hoad won the opening match of the final at Adelaide in December against Olmedo on grass. In an interview in 1980, Hoad stated that "I finally finished playing seriously, in about 1962". Hoad was voted the world No. 1 professional tennis player for 1962 in a UPI poll of 85 U.S. sports editors held at the end of January 1963 following the Australian tour.

1963
In January 1963, Hoad and Rosewall guaranteed the contract of new pro Rod Laver. Hoad defeated Laver 8–0 in an Australian tour, some of their matches played to best-of-five and televised from sold-out stadiums. On Laver's pro debut on 5 January, Hoad beat Laver at White City stadium in Sydney on a "slippery" grass surface. Their match at the Kooyong stadium in Melbourne on grass was a close contest, with Laver extending Hoad to five sets before losing. After the Australian series, Hoad was inactive for five months, partly due to a shoulder injury. Hoad did not plan to participate in the World Tour for 1963. On his return in June, he lost to Laver in the semifinal of the Adler Pro, and at the Forest Hills U.S. Pro tournament he lost to Buchholz in the first round. The Forest Hills event did not have a television contract, was a financial failure, and the players, with the exception of Gonzales, were not paid. At the French Pro indoor event at Stade Coubertin in September, Hoad was defeated in straight sets by Rosewall in the semifinal and lost the third place play-off against Sedgman. At the Wembley Pro, he reached the final after surviving a marathon semifinal against Buchholz in which he strained his leg muscle and was limping throughout most of the match. McCauley acclaimed the semi-final with Buchholz "one of the best contests ever staged at Wembley". Hoad was tired and sluggish in the final, which again he lost to Rosewall, this time in four sets. At the Tokyo Japanese Pro in November, Hoad defeated Rosewall in the preliminary round, but lost the third place match to Sedgman, Buchholz defeating Laver in the final. At the end of the World Championship Tour earlier in the season, Laver had finished second and was officially ranked the No. 2 professional player behind Rosewall. Hoad did not play in the World Tour, and was not officially ranked.

1964–67  
In February and March 1964, Hoad played a 16-day 24-match best-of-three sets tour of New Zealand with Laver, Rosewall, and Anderson. Hoad and Laver both finished on top with seven wins and five losses, but Hoad won first place with a 3 to 1 head-to-head score against Laver.  In late September 1964, Hoad and Gonzales played a four match best-of-three sets head-to-head series in Britain, at Brighton, Carlyon Bay (Cornwall), Cardiff (Wales), and Glasgow (Scotland). Hoad won at Carlyon Bay and Cardiff, while Gonzales won at Brighton and Glasgow. Hoad experienced foot trouble in 1964 and finished in sixth place in the tournament series point system. In early 1965, much of his large right toe was removed, and he was only able to play a limited schedule thereafter. Hoad won his final victories against Laver in January 1966 at White City in Sydney, his home town, defeating him in straight sets, and at Forest Hills, New York in a round robin match in June 1966.

After the expiration of his seven-year contract on 14 November 1966, Hoad withdrew from competitive play for ten months. Hoad and his wife invested in the construction and development of a tennis club resort and a related residential complex in southern Spain. He returned unexpectedly to participate in the Wimbledon Pro tournament in late August 1967.
The Wimbledon Pro was a three-day BBC televised tournament organised by the All-England Club as a trial for "open" tennis and as such the first Wimbledon tournament open to male professional tennis players. Hoad was one of the eight players invited for the singles event and despite being in semi-retirement and without competitive play for ten months, he won his first match against  Gonzales in three sets. The BBC television commentator called it "the finest match ever seen on these hallowed grounds." This would be the last match on grass between Hoad and Gonzales, with Hoad holding a lifetime edge on grass over Gonzales of 21 matches to 14. With little energy left he lost the semifinal to Rosewall in two straight sets. Hoad played for an eight-week period on the pro tour in 1967, and then retired permanently from regular competitive tennis play.

Open era 1968–1973
Back problems plagued Hoad throughout his career and forced his retirement from the tennis tour in October 1967 but the advent of the Open Era enticed him to make sporadic appearances at tournaments. Hoad lost in the final of the Irish Championships at Dublin in July 1968 to Tom Okker in straight sets, hampered by a thigh injury. In November 1969, Hoad won the Dewar Cup Aberavon singles title, part of the Dewar Cup indoor circuit, defeating Mark Cox in the semifinal and Bob Hewitt in the final, both wins in two straight sets. At the 1970 Italian Open, he lost in the third round in four sets to Alex Metreveli. At the 1970 French Open, he defeated Charlie Pasarell in four close sets, and reached the fourth round before succumbing to eventual finalist Željko Franulović. At Wimbledon that year he lost in the second round to Ismail El Shafei.

Hoad won his final tournament singles title on 7 August 1971, the Playmon Fiesta 71, on red clay at Benidorm, Spain. He defeated Antonio Muñoz in the semifinal and Manuel Santana in the final by identical scores of 9–7, 6–3. This would mark a twenty-year span during which Hoad won men's singles titles in tennis, between the ages of 16 and 36, dating back to the Brisbane tournament of August 1951. In spring 1972, Hoad played the doubles final at Italian Open with Frew McMillan against Ilie Năstase and Ion Ţiriac. Hoad/McMillan led 2–0 in sets but retired at 3–5 down in the fifth set in protest of the poor light conditions and the antics of the Rumanian pair. At the end of June, at the age of 37, Hoad made his final Wimbledon appearance losing in the first round to Jürgen Fassbender in four sets. Hoad's final match was a first round loss to Jurgen Fassbender in Johannesburg in November 1973.

From 1970 to 1974, Hoad was the coach of the Spanish Davis Cup team.

According to research done for a 1970 British Pathé documentary film about Hoad's tennis ranch, Hoad had "made about GBP 350,000 as a professional". Per a 1977 newspaper interview, “Throughout his career, Hoad earned a total of £250,000, less than many pros collect in a year now.  He received £150 for his Wimbledon victories; the payoff now is £17,500.”

Career summary

Hoad's win–loss ratio for 1956 in all matches was 114/129 or 88%. His win ratio in 1958 was 41% (winning 64 of 155 matches). However, Hoad's win rates on the world championship tour that year (36/87 or 41%) and in the 1959 four-man tour (68%) compare favourably to Rosewall's percentages on the 1957 world championship tour (34%) and on the 1960 four man tour (56%). In the 1959 Ampol Open Trophy tournament series, Hoad's winning percentage was 71% (36/51) compared to Gonzales' 72% (26/36) and Rosewall's 62% (26/42). Gonzales defaulted three Ampol tournaments and played 15 fewer matches than Hoad in the tournament series. For the 1959 season as a whole, Hoad had a 24 to 23 edge in wins against Gonzales, a consistency which surpasses any other opponent of Gonzales during his world champion years. Hoad's lifetime edge over Gonzales on grass was 21 wins to 14 losses (60%). Hoad trails Rosewall lifetime in grasscourt matches, 17 to 27, Hoad's results declining after 1961. Hoad was 15 wins and 18 losses against Rosewall lifetime in grass court tournament play (1951–1967).  Hoad was 17 wins and 21 losses lifetime on clay against Rosewall, and 10 wins and 13 losses lifetime on clay against Trabert. Lifetime on all surfaces, primarily indoor, in approximate numbers, Hoad trails Gonzales 78–104 and trails Rosewall 51–84. In the five Tournament of Champions events from 1957 to 1959 in which both players were entered, Hoad held a 3 to 2 edge over Gonzales in head-to-head play, all on grass.

On the head-to-head tours of the era (1958, 1959, 1961), Hoad compiled 57 wins and 68 losses against Gonzales, the best head-to-head showing of any pro against the reigning champion Gonzales. In the 1959 Ampol series, Hoad's record was 3 wins and 5 losses against Gonzales. However, Hoad was more consistent than Gonzales against the other ten players in the Ampol series, winning 33 of 43 matches (77%), while Gonzales won 21 of 28 (75%), and this gave Hoad the overall victory in the series. Hoad won six tournaments compared to Gonzales' four, and he had 6 wins and 2 losses against Rosewall on the 1959 Ampol series, while Gonzales had 1 win and 3 losses against Rosewall. Hoad had a 15–13 edge over Gonzales in their meetings on the 4-man championship tour of 1959, but Hoad was deprived of overall victory on this tour because he was less consistent than Gonzales when facing the rookie pros, Mal Anderson and Ashley Cooper. Hoad's combined record against the rookies was 27–7 compared to Gonzales’ 34–0.

Hoad was a dominant doubles player. He won nine Grand Slam doubles titles, including one Mixed doubles title, and a Career Grand Slam in men's doubles. Hoad won 21 major men's doubles titles over 14 seasons (eight Grand Slam, thirteen Pro Slam), a pre-Open era record, shared with Rosewall.  He also won the 1959 Forest Hills TOC doubles title. Rosewall won 24 major men's doubles titles over 20 seasons, and Mike Bryan won 18 over 15 seasons. Hoad and Rosewall together as a doubles team won 15 major doubles titles (six Grand Slam plus nine Pro Slam), one fewer than the Bryan brothers at 16. Hoad and Trabert won four major doubles titles together (three French Pro, one Wembley Pro) plus the 1959 Forest Hills TOC doubles title. Hoad won a record seven French Pro men's doubles titles, and consecutively.

Playing style

Strength of arm and wrist played an important part in Hoad's game, as he often drove for winners rather than rallying and waiting for the "right" opportunity, though he also had the skill to win the French Championships on the slower clay court. Hoad played right-handed and had a powerful serve and groundstrokes.  Hoad's game was reported to lack consistency in some accounts. At times Hoad had difficulty maintaining concentration. According to Kramer, "Hoad had the loosest game of any good kid I ever saw. There was absolutely no pattern to his game.... He was the only player I ever saw who could stand six or seven feet behind the baseline and snap the ball back hard, crosscourt. He'd try for winners off everything, off great serves, off tricky short balls, off low volleys. He hit hard overspin drives, and there was no way you could ever get him to temporise on important points."

Hoad was runner-up for the Australian junior table tennis championship in 1951, and developed strong wrists and arms through heavy weight-lifting regimes.  Hoad would use wrist strength in his strokes to make last split-second changes in racquet direction. He would saw off about an inch from the ends of his racquet handles, which were short to begin with, and move the grip higher to wield his racquets as if they were ping-pong bats. Hoad would use wrist action to give heavy topspin to his groundstrokes.

Assessment

By journalists

In The Encyclopedia of Tennis (1973) veteran sportswriters Allison Danzig and Lance Tingay as well as tennis coach, writer and former player Harry Hopman listed their personal choices of the ten greatest players in tennis history. Only Tingay included Hoad in his list, ranking him in fifth position, behind Tilden, Budge, Laver and Gonzales.

Max Robertson, tennis author and commentator, rated Hoad as the best post-war Wimbledon player, followed by Gonzales and Laver, in his 1977 book Wimbledon 1877–1977.  In his second book about Wimbledon, Wimbledon – Centre Court of the Game (1981) his list was unchanged but in the second edition in 1987 he listed Hoad second behind Boris Becker.

In 100 Greatest of All Time, a 2012 television series broadcast by the Tennis Channel, Hoad was ranked the 19th greatest male player, just behind fellow Australian John Newcombe at 18th, and just ahead of tour promoter Jack Kramer, who had signed Hoad to the professional ranks, at 21st, and Hoad's longtime tennis rival Gonzales at 22nd.

In 2016, tennis journalist Richard Evans stated that in his judgment Hoad was the greatest player in the world before the emergence of Federer, and "was without question the strongest man who ever played the game."

In 2017, tennis journalist Shuvam Chakraborty stated that "winning the biggest titles has always been a hallmark of greatness for players throughout the ages. But for [the] old pros, if you ask them who the greatest player of their day was, they will all say one man – Lew Hoad." And "compared to some of his contemporaries, Hoad’s resume may not stand out. However, his peaks might have been the highest of all time. His peers would certainly agree with that."

In 2021, tennis journalist Rémi Bourrières (Former Deputy Editor-in-Chief of Tennis Magazine (2007-2019)) ranked Hoad at No. 3 among the pre-Open players, behind Tilden and Budge. Bourrières ranking was (1) Tilden (2) Budge (3) Hoad (4) Gonzales (5) Perry (6) Cochet (7) Lacoste (8) Santana (9) Renshaw (10) Ashe. Bourrières summarized Hoad as: "This tall blond man with the physique of an Apollo and almost animal strength was perhaps the best of that glorious Australian generation that was to dominate the world in the middle of the 20th century: Laver, Rosewall and others."

By players
Fred Perry in 1978 "put Borg in a class with Jack Kramer, Lew Hoad, Pancho Gonzales and Ellsworth Vines".  In 1983 Perry listed his greatest male players of all time and listed them in two categories, before World War 2 and after. Perry's modern best behind Laver: "Borg, McEnroe, Connors, Hoad, Jack Kramer, John Newcombe, Ken Rosewall, Manuel Santana". Perry stated "the match I’d love to see would be Lew Hoad against Borg. Hoad was better than most thought. He hit so hard and so quickly off the ground he would have stretched Borg."

Don Budge stated, “If Lew Hoad was on, you may as well just go home or have tea, because you weren’t going to beat him.” Budge did not include Hoad in his top five greatest of all-time list in a 1975 newspaper interview, citing  (1) Ellsworth Vines (2) Jack Kramer  (3) Fred Perry (4) Bill Tilden  and (5) Rod Laver.

In July 1961, Gardnar Mulloy ranked Hoad as the greatest player of the time, based on his results against Gonzales, and named Hoad as the favourite to win a prospective open Wimbledon.

Kramer had a negative assessment of Hoad's consistency. Although Kramer ranked him one of the 21 best players of all time, albeit in his second echelon, he also writes that "when you sum Hoad up, you have to say that he was overrated. He might have been the best, but day-to-day, week-to-week, he was the most inconsistent of all the top players." Kramer compared Hoad to Ellsworth Vines. "Both were very strong guys. Both succeeded at a very young age.... Also, both were very lazy guys. Vines lost interest in tennis (for golf) before he was thirty, and Hoad never appeared to be very interested. Despite their great natural ability, neither put up the outstanding records that they were capable of. Unfortunately, the latter was largely true because both had physical problems." However, Kramer had a positive evaluation of Hoad's game when motivated, “When Lew felt like playing, man, he was really something.  I never saw anybody who could snap the ball back hard off both sides from way behind the baseline for winners the way he did.” Kramer stated in 1981, "Everybody loved Hoad, even Pancho Gonzales. They should put that on Lew's tombstone as the ultimate praise for the man.... Even when Hoad was clobbering Gonzales, Gorgo wanted his respect and friendship."

Gonzales stated that Hoad was the toughest, most skillful adversary that he had ever faced and stated in a 1995 interview that "He was the only guy who, if I was playing my best tennis, could still beat me.". "I think his game was the best game ever. Better than mine. He was capable of making more shots than anybody. His two volleys were great. His overhead was enormous. He had the most natural tennis mind with the most natural tennis physique." In a 1970 interview he stated that "Hoad was probably the best and toughest player when he wanted to be. After the first two years on the tour, his back injury plagued him so much that he lost the desire to practice. He was the only man to beat me in a head-to-head tour, 15 to 13." In a 1975 issue of Sports Illustrated, Arthur Ashe was quoted as relating a remark which Pancho Gonzales had said to him, "If there was ever a Universe Davis Cup, and I had to pick one man to represent Planet Earth, I would pick Lew Hoad in his prime."

In a 1963 article in World Tennis, Rosewall judged Gonzales to be a notch above Hoad but stated that "...the latter is the greatest of all time when he is 'on'."  In 2010, Rosewall ranked Hoad at the top of his personal list of the top four greatest tennis players of all time, ahead of Gonzales, Laver, and Federer. However, in 2017, Rosewall was asked the question in Italian publication Corriere della Sera if he believed Roger Federer was the greatest of all time and he replied "there is no doubt.  I challenge anyone to argue otherwise".

Hoad gave his own rankings in a 1980 interview, ranking Emerson and Borg at the top in terms of major tournaments won. However, Hoad claimed that "the only way to really assess players is to play them", rating Gonzales as the best player of those whom he had played against.

In 1988, a panel consisting of Bud Collins, Cliff Drysdale, and Butch Buchholz ranked the top three male tennis players as Laver, Borg and McEnroe. Buchholz ranked Laver, Borg, Rosewall, Gonzales, and McEnroe as his top five choices, while Drysdale ranked Hoad tied with Connors in fifth place behind Laver, Borg, Budge, and McEnroe. However, in 2007 Buchholz ranked Hoad as the greatest player of their time, but said he was injury prone and not exactly a model of fitness. Buchholz stated that "If you had an Earth vs. Mars match, and had to send one man to represent the planet, I would send Hoad."  Buchholz had played the undercard matches on Hoad's 1961 British tour against Gonzales, and Hoad's 1963 Australian tour against Laver.

Frew McMillan stated his opinion of Hoad in 2001. "The finest player of all time? Possibly. At his best certainly the greatest of the greats that I have seen. Light on his feet yet with the punching power of a fierce fighter. I could marvel at Rod Laver and McEnroe, their flair and artistic strength, but Hoad's ruthless efficiency would take my breath away."

Gordon Forbes gave his opinion in a 2009 interview. "The best they knew? Hoad, says Forbes. Better than Rod Laver? “Hoad was much stronger, bigger. They were both magicians but Hoad was the best.”"

Rod Laver in 2012 ranked Hoad as the greatest player of the 'past champions' era of tennis, while ranking Federer as the greatest player of the Open Era. Laver described Hoad's strengths of "power, volleying and explosiveness" as justification of his accolade. In July 2012, when Federer won his seventh Wimbledon singles championship, Laver said "Roger Federer certainly is my claim to be the best of all time if there is such a thing" and in January 2018, at the Australian Open won by Federer, Laver said "For me, I think Roger Federer is certainly the greatest player that has come along" and "He's stood the test of time – that's probably the one thing that puts you in that category of the best ever." However, in a January 2019 interview, Laver stated that Hoad was "the best player who ever held a racquet. He had every shot in the book and he could overpower anyone. He was so strong." Pancho Gonzales made a similar remark about Hoad, "He was such a strong son****...when he tried, you just couldn't beat him. He hit the ball harder than anyone I ever played."

Personal life

Hoad proposed to his girlfriend, Australian tennis player Jenny Staley, on her 21st birthday party in March 1955 and they planned to announce their engagement in June in London while both were on an overseas tour. After arrival in London Jenny discovered that she was pregnant and the couple decided to get married straight away. The marriage took place the following day on 18 June 1955 at St Mary's Church, Wimbledon, in London, on the eve of Wimbledon fortnight. They had two daughters and a son.

After announcing his retirement in 1967, due to persistent back problems, Hoad moved to Fuengirola, Spain, near Málaga, where he and his wife constructed, owned and operated a tennis resort, Lew Hoad's Campo de Tenis, and the accompanying residential complex of apartments and penthouse properties, Lew Hoad Tennis Village. For more than thirty years they entertained personal friends such as actors Stewart Granger, Sean Connery, Richard Burton, Peter Ustinov, Deborah Kerr and her husband  writer Peter Viertel, actor Kirk Douglas, singer Frank Sinatra and saxophonist Stan Getz.  Hoad's son Peter stated, "My dad was extremely well connected." The athletic club including the wedding/event facilities were acquired by Spanish investors in 2005, and in 2021 were rumoured to be for sale at 10 million euros. The Lew Hoad Club currently has seven tennis courts and six paddle courts, outdoor pool and gym. Weddings and events are a specialty, plus an annual ITF seniors tennis tournament and an annual IBP women's tournament.

In September 1978, Hoad's back problem was successfully treated with spinal fusion surgery, and he was relieved of pain. There had been two ruptured discs and a herniation. The doctor asked one of Hoad's friends, "How on earth did this man walk, let alone play tennis?" In a 1980 interview, Hoad claimed that "my back is marvelous now....it's absolutely perfect now."

Hoad was diagnosed with a rare and incurable form of leukaemia on 13 January 1994 which caused his death on 3 July 1994. Press reports of a heart attack were incorrect. Hoad's personal physician specialist was his own son-in-law Dr. Manuel Benavides, who explained the cause of death. A book co-written with Jack Pollard and titled My Game ("The Lew Hoad story" in the USA) was published in 1958. In 2002, Pollard teamed up with his widow, Jenny, to write My Life With Lew.

Honours
Hoad was inducted into the International Tennis Hall of Fame in Newport, in 1980 and in December 1985 was inducted into the Sport Australia Hall of Fame. In January 1995 he was posthumously inducted into the Tennis Australia Hall of Fame together with friend and rival Ken Rosewall.

The ITF organises a seniors tournament in his honour called The Lew Hoad Memorial ITF Veterans Tournament, which is hosted by the Lew Hoad Campo de Tenis.
The Kooyong Classic at Kooyong Stadium, the principal warm-up event for the Australian Open, awards the Lew Hoad Memorial Trophy to the winner of the men's singles. Kooyong stadium was the site of some of Hoad's greatest victories.

The Lewis Hoad Reserve in Sydney and the Lew Hoad Avenue in Baton Rouge, Louisiana are named after him.

Performance timeline

Singles
Hoad joined the professional tennis circuit in 1957 and as a consequence was banned from competing in 42 Grand Slam tournaments until the start of the Open Era at the 1968 French Open.

Grand Slam and Pro Slam finals

Singles

Grand Slam finals (4–2)

Pro Slam finals (0–7)

Doubles: 13 (8 titles, 5 runner-ups)

Mixed doubles: 4 (1 title, 3 runner-ups)

Other important finals

See also
Overall tennis records – Men's singles

Notes

References

Sources

Biographies

External links

 
 
 
 
 
 Hoad vs. Rosewall, 1955 NSW final, White City, Sydney-newsreel
 Hoad vs. Sirola, 1956 German final, Hamburg, at 8:20-newsreel
 Hoad df. Rosewall, 1959 Roland Garros 3rd place-newsreel
 Lew Hoad Tennis and Paddle Club

Australian Championships (tennis) champions
Australian Championships (tennis) junior champions
Australian expatriate sportspeople in Spain
Australian male tennis players
French Championships (tennis) champions
People from Fuengirola
Sportspeople from the Province of Málaga
Tennis players from Sydney
International Tennis Hall of Fame inductees
United States National champions (tennis)
Wimbledon champions (pre-Open Era)
1934 births
1994 deaths
Grand Slam (tennis) champions in men's singles
Grand Slam (tennis) champions in mixed doubles
Grand Slam (tennis) champions in men's doubles
Deaths from leukemia
Professional tennis players before the Open Era
Grand Slam (tennis) champions in boys' singles
Grand Slam (tennis) champions in boys' doubles
World number 1 ranked male tennis players
Sport Australia Hall of Fame inductees